Laurie Weeden (born in Toronto, Ontario) is an Australian female curler originally from Canada.

She works for Australian Curling Federation as secretary.

Teammates and events

Women's

Mixed

Mixed doubles

References

External links
 

 Video: 

Living people
1970 births
Australian female curlers
Australian curling champions
Australian people of Canadian descent
Canadian expatriate sportspeople in Australia
Curlers from Toronto